Dypvåg is a village in Tvedestrand municipality in Agder county, Norway. The village was the administrative centre of the old municipality of Dypvåg which existed from 1838 until its dissolution in 1960. The historic Dypvåg Church is located in the village.

Name
The village is named after the old Dybvaag farm (Old Norse: Djúpvágr or Djúpivágr), since the first Dypvåg Church was built there. The first element comes from dype which means "deep" and the last element is våg which means "water" or "harbor". The spelling was changed from Dybvaag to Dypvåg around the early 20th century.

Notable residents
Jens Marcussen (1926–2007), a politician
Kristian Vilhelm Koren Schjelderup, Jr. (1894–1980), a theologian
Peter Olrog Schjøtt (1833–1926), a philologist

References

Villages in Agder
Tvedestrand